Holmes Bluff is a bluff marking the northern end of the Demas Range on the coast of Marie Byrd Land, Antarctica. The feature was observed from aircraft of the U.S. Antarctic Service, 1939–41, but was first mapped in detail by the United States Geological Survey, 1959–65. It was named by the Advisory Committee on Antarctic Names for Thomas J. Holmes, a United States Antarctic Research Program meteorologist at Byrd Station in 1961.

References

Cliffs of Marie Byrd Land